Kandyba or Candyba (Hittite: 𒄭𒅔𒁺𒉿 Hinduwa, Lycian: 𐊜𐊙𐊋𐊂𐊆 Xãkbi) was a settlement in ancient Lycia, in modern-day Antalya province on the southwestern Mediterranean coast of Turkey. 

The modern Turkish village next to the ruins of ancient Kandyba is named Çataloluk.

Name 
The name Kandyba is the Greek version of the Lycian name Khãkbi, which is a variation of the Bronze Age Hittite name Hinduwa. According to Greek legends, it took its name from the Candybus, son of Deucalion from Greek mythology.

Geography 
The ancient settlement is set on a hilltop high above the plain of Kasaba, 13 kilometres north of Kaş. The modern village is located to the south of the ruins.

History 

In antiquity, Candyba was one of the smaller cities of Lycia, but was an independent polis with voting rights in the Lycian League and minted its own coins.

Since it was in the Roman province of Lycia, the bishopric of Candyba was a suffragan of the metropolitan see of Myra, the province's capital. The names of two of its bishops are preserved in extant records. Constantinus took part in the Second Council of Nicaea in 787; and Basilius was at the Photian Council of Constantinople (879).

No longer a residential bishopric, Candyba is today listed by the Catholic Church as a titular see.

Archaeology 
Some of the rock tombs are beautifully executed. One perfect inscription in Lycian characters was found. A coin procured on the spot from the peasantry had the letters KAND on it.

References 

 Martin Zimmermann: Untersuchungen zur historischen Landeskunde Zentrallykiens, Bonn 1992, pp. 56–61.
 Hansgerd Hellenkemper, Friedrich Hild: Lykien und Pamphylien. Tabula Imperii Byzantini 8. Vienna 2004. Vol. 2, pp. 595–596.

External links 
 Description and photos of Kandyba (in German)

Archaeological sites in Antalya Province
Hellenistic colonies in Anatolia
Ancient Greek archaeological sites in Turkey
Former populated places in Turkey
Geography of Antalya Province
Populated places in ancient Lycia
Kaş District